Serhiy Khaindrava (born: 23 December 1961, Born in the USSR) is a sailor. who represented the Unified Team at the 1992 Summer Olympics in Barcelona, Spain as crew member in the Soling. With helmsman Serhiy Pichuhin and fellow crew member Volodymyr Korotkov they took the 9th place. Serhiy with helmsman Serhiy Pichuhin and fellow crew member Volodymyr Korotkov took 7th place during the 1996 Summer Olympics in Savannah, United States in the Soling.

References

Living people
1961 births
Sailors at the 1992 Summer Olympics – Soling
Sailors at the 1996 Summer Olympics – Soling
Olympic sailors of the Unified Team
Olympic sailors of Ukraine
Ukrainian male sailors (sport)